Sahan may refer to:

People
 Sahan Palihakkara, Sri Lankan cricketer
 Sahan Wijesiri, Sri Lankan cricketer

See also
 Şahan, Armenian name
 Sahan Kalan, village in Tehsil Kharian, in the Gujrat District of Punjab, Pakistan